Mali, officially the Republic of Mali, is a landlocked country in West Africa. The population of Mali is  million. 67% of its population was estimated to be under the age of 25 in 2017. Its capital and largest city is Bamako. The sovereign state of Mali consists of ten regions and its borders on the north reach deep into the middle of the Sahara Desert. The country's southern part is in the Sudanian savanna, where the majority of inhabitants live, and both the Niger and Senegal rivers pass through. The country's economy centres on agriculture and mining. One of Mali's most prominent natural resources is gold, and the country is the third largest producer of gold on the African continent. It also exports salt.

Present-day Mali was once part of three extremely powerful and wealthy West African empires that controlled trans-Saharan trade: the Ghana Empire (for which Ghana is named), the Mali Empire (for which Mali is named), and the Songhai Empire. At its peak in 1300, the Mali Empire was the wealthiest country in Africa, covering an area about twice the size of modern-day France and stretched to the west coast of the continent. Mali was also one of the wealthiest countries on earth, and its emperor at its zenith, Mansa Musa, is believed to be possibly the wealthiest individual in history. Besides being an economic powerhouse, medieval Mali was a centre of Islam, culture and knowledge, with Timbuktu becoming a renowned place of learning with its university, one of the oldest in the world still active. The expanding Songhai Empire absorbed the empire in 1468, followed by a Moroccan army which defeated the Songhai in 1591. The Moroccan colonists established a new ruling class, the Arma, who after 1631 became virtually independent of Morocco. In the late 19th century, during the Scramble for Africa, France seized control of Mali, making it a part of French Sudan. French Sudan (then known as the Sudanese Republic) joined with Senegal in 1959, achieving independence in 1960 as the Mali Federation. Shortly thereafter, following Senegal's withdrawal from the federation, the Sudanese Republic declared itself the independent Republic of Mali. After a long period of one-party rule, a coup in 1991 led to the writing of a new constitution and the establishment of Mali as a democratic, multi-party state.

In January 2012, an armed conflict broke out in northern Mali, in which Tuareg rebels took control of a territory in the north, and in April declared the secession of a new state, Azawad. The conflict was complicated by a military coup that took place in March and later fighting between Tuareg and other rebel factions. In response to territorial gains, the French military launched Operation Serval in January 2013. A month later, Malian and French forces recaptured most of the north, although the conflict still continued. Presidential elections were held on 28 July 2013, with a second-round run-off held on 11 August, and legislative elections were held on 24 November and 15 December 2013.

In the early 2020s Mali experienced two military takeovers by Assimi Goïta.

Etymology 
The name Mali is taken from the name of the Mali Empire. The name means "the place where the king lives" and carries a connotation of strength.

Guinean writer Djibril Niane suggests in Sundiata: An Epic of Old Mali (1965) that it is not impossible that Mali was the name given to one of the capitals of the emperors. 14th-century Moroccan traveler Ibn Battuta reported that the capital of the Mali Empire was called Mali. One Mandinka tradition tells that the legendary first emperor Sundiata Keita changed himself into a hippopotamus upon his death in the Sankarani River and that it's possible to find villages in the area of this river, termed "old Mali", which have Mali for a name. A study of Malian proverbs noted that in old Mali, there is a village called Malikoma, which means "New Mali", and that Mali could have formerly been the name of a city.

Another theory suggests that Mali is a Fulani pronunciation of the name of the Mande peoples.

History

Rock paintings and carvings indicate that northern Mali has been inhabited since prehistoric times when the Sahara was fertile grassland. Farming took place by 5000 BC and iron was used around 500 BC.

The rock art in the Sahara suggests that northern Mali has been inhabited since 10,000 BC, when the Sahara was fertile and rich in wildlife. Early ceramics have been discovered at the central Malian site of Ounjougou dating to about 9,400 BC, and are believed to represent an instance of the independent invention of pottery in the region.

In the first millennium BC, early cities and towns were created by Mande peoples related to the Soninke people, along the middle Niger River in central Mali, including Dia which began from around 900 BC, and reached its peak around 600 BC, and Djenne-Djenno, which lasted from around 300 BC to 900 AD. By the sixth century AD, the lucrative trans-Saharan trade in gold, salt and slaves had begun, facilitating the rise of West Africa's great empires.

There are a few references to Mali in early Islamic literature. Among these are references to "Pene" and "Malal" in the work of al-Bakri in 1068, the story of the conversion of an early ruler, known to Ibn Khaldun (by 1397) as Barmandana, and a few geographical details in the work of al-Idrisi.

Mali was once part of three famed West African empires which controlled trans-Saharan trade in gold, salt, other precious commodities, and slaves majorly during the reign of Mansa Musa from c. 1312 – c. 1337. These Sahelian kingdoms had neither rigid geopolitical boundaries nor rigid ethnic identities. The earliest of these empires was the Ghana Empire, which was dominated by the Soninke, a Mande-speaking people. The empire expanded throughout West Africa from the eighth century until 1078, when it was conquered by the Almoravids.

The Battle of Kirina in 1235, culminated in a victory for the Mandinka under the command of the exiled prince Sundiata Keita, which led to the downfall of the Sosso Empire.

The Mali Empire later formed on the upper Niger River, and reached the height of power in the 14th century. Under the Mali Empire, the ancient cities of Djenné and Timbuktu were centers of both trade and Islamic learning. The empire later declined as a result of internal intrigue, ultimately being supplanted by the Songhai Empire. The Songhai people originated in current northwestern Nigeria. The Songhai had long been a major power in West Africa subject to the Mali Empire's rule.

In the late 14th century, the Songhai gradually gained independence from the Mali Empire and expanded, ultimately subsuming the entire eastern portion of the Mali Empire. The Songhai Empire's eventual collapse was largely the result of a Moroccan invasion in 1591, under the command of Judar Pasha. The fall of the Songhai Empire marked the end of the region's role as a trading crossroads. Following the establishment of sea routes by the European powers, the trans-Saharan trade routes lost significance. At that time, the Mali Empire's abundance in wealth expanded its commercial assets of salt and gold.

One of the worst famines in the region's recorded history occurred in the 18th century. According to John Iliffe, "The worst crises were in the 1680s, when famine extended from the Senegambian coast to the Upper Nile and 'many sold themselves for slaves, only to get a sustenance', and especially in 1738–1756, when West Africa's greatest recorded subsistence crisis, due to drought and locusts, reportedly killed half the population of Timbuktu."

French colonial rule

Mali fell under the control of France during the late 19th century. By 1905, most of the area was under firm French control as a part of French Sudan. On 24 November 1958, French Sudan (which changed its name to the Sudanese Republic) became an autonomous republic within the French Community. In January 1959, Mali and Senegal united to become the Mali Federation. The Mali Federation gained independence from France on 20 June 1960.

Senegal withdrew from the federation in August 1960, which allowed the Sudanese Republic to become the independent Republic of Mali on 22 September 1960, and that date is now the country's Independence Day. Modibo Keïta was elected the first president. Keïta quickly established a one-party state, adopted an independent African and socialist orientation with close ties to the East, and implemented extensive nationalization of economic resources. In 1960, the population of Mali was reported to be about 4.1 million.

Moussa Traoré
On 19 November 1968, following progressive economic decline, the Keïta regime was overthrown in a bloodless military coup led by Moussa Traoré, a day which is now commemorated as Liberation Day. The subsequent military-led regime, with Traoré as president, attempted to reform the economy. His efforts were frustrated by political turmoil and a devastating drought between 1968 and 1974, in which famine killed thousands of people. The Traoré regime faced student unrest beginning in the late 1970s and three coup attempts. The Traoré regime repressed all dissenters until the late 1980s.

The government continued to attempt economic reforms, and the populace became increasingly dissatisfied. In response to growing demands for multi-party democracy, the Traoré regime allowed some limited political liberalization. They refused to usher in a full-fledged democratic system. In 1990, cohesive opposition movements began to emerge, and was complicated by the turbulent rise of ethnic violence in the north following the return of many Tuaregs to Mali.

Anti-government protests in 1991 led to a coup, a transitional government, and a new constitution. Opposition to the corrupt and dictatorial regime of General Moussa Traoré grew during the 1980s. During this time strict programs, imposed to satisfy demands of the International Monetary Fund, brought increased hardship upon the country's population, while elites close to the government supposedly lived in growing wealth. Peaceful student protests in January 1991 were brutally suppressed, with mass arrests and torture of leaders and participants. Scattered acts of rioting and vandalism of public buildings followed, but most actions by the dissidents remained nonviolent.

March Revolution
From 22 March through 26 March 1991, mass pro-democracy rallies and a nationwide strike was held in both urban and rural communities, which became known as les évenements ("the events") or the March Revolution. In Bamako, in response to mass demonstrations organized by university students and later joined by trade unionists and others, soldiers opened fire indiscriminately on the nonviolent demonstrators. Riots broke out briefly following the shootings. Barricades as well as roadblocks were erected and Traoré declared a state of emergency and imposed a nightly curfew. Despite an estimated loss of 300 lives over the course of four days, nonviolent protesters continued to return to Bamako each day demanding the resignation of the dictatorial president and the implementation of democratic policies.

26 March 1991 is the day that marks the clash between military soldiers and peaceful demonstrating students which climaxed in the massacre of dozens under the orders of then President Moussa Traoré. He and three associates were later tried and convicted and received the death sentence for their part in the decision-making of that day. Nowadays, the day is a national holiday in order to remember the tragic events and the people who were killed. The coup is remembered as Mali's March Revolution of 1991.

By 26 March, the growing refusal of soldiers to fire into the largely nonviolent protesting crowds turned into a full-scale tumult, and resulted in thousands of soldiers putting down their arms and joining the pro-democracy movement. That afternoon, Lieutenant Colonel Amadou Toumani Touré announced on the radio that he had arrested the dictatorial president, Moussa Traoré. As a consequence, opposition parties were legalized and a national congress of civil and political groups met to draft a new democratic constitution to be approved by a national referendum.

Amadou Toumani Touré presidency
In 1992, Alpha Oumar Konaré won Mali's first democratic, multi-party presidential election, before being re-elected for a second term in 1997, which was the last allowed under the constitution. Amadou Toumani Touré, a retired general who had been the leader of the military aspect of the 1991 democratic uprising, was elected in 2002. During this democratic period Mali was regarded as one of the most politically and socially stable countries in Africa.

Slavery persists in Mali today with as many as 200,000 people held in direct servitude to a master. In the Tuareg Rebellion of 2012, ex-slaves were a vulnerable population with reports of some slaves being recaptured by their former masters.

Northern Mali conflict

In January 2012 a Tuareg rebellion began in Northern Mali, led by the National Movement for the Liberation of Azawad (MNLA). In March, military officer Amadou Sanogo seized power in a coup d'état, citing Touré's failures in quelling the rebellion, and leading to sanctions and an embargo by the Economic Community of West African States. The MNLA quickly took control of the north, declaring independence as Azawad. However, Islamist groups including Ansar Dine and Al-Qaeda in the Islamic Maghreb (AQIM), who had helped the MNLA defeat the government, turned on the Tuareg and took control of the North with the goal of implementing sharia in Mali.

On 11 January 2013, the French Armed Forces intervened at the request of the interim government.
On 30 January, the coordinated advance of the French and Malian troops claimed to have retaken the last remaining Islamist stronghold of Kidal, which was also the last of three northern provincial capitals. On 2 February, French president François Hollande joined Mali's interim president Dioncounda Traoré in a public appearance in recently recaptured Timbuktu.

In August 2013, Ibrahim Boubacar Keita was elected as the new president of Mali after his rival admitted defeat in the second round of the election.

Conflict in Central Mali 
In the central Mali province of Mopti, conflict has escalated since 2015 between agricultural communities like the Dogon and the Bambara, and the pastoral Fula (or Fulani) people. Historically, the two sides have fought over access to land and water, factors which have been exacerbated by climate change as the Fula move into new areas. The Dogon and the Bambara communities have formed militias, or "self-defense groups", to fight the Fula. They accuse the Fula of working with armed Islamists linked to al-Qaeda. While some Fula have joined Islamist groups, Human Rights Watch reports that the links have been "exaggerated and instrumentalized by different actors for opportunistic ends".

Added a top Mali military commander:"I’ve discussed the growing violence with my commanders and with village chiefs from all sides. Yes, sure, there are jihadists in this zone, but the real problem is banditry, animal theft, score settling – people are enriching themselves using the fight against terrorists as a cover."The conflict has seen the creation and growth of Dogon and Bambara militias. The government of Mali is suspected of supporting some of these groups under the guise of they being proxies in the war against Islamists in the Northern Mali conflict. The government denies this. One such militia is the Dogon group Dan Na Ambassagou, created in 2016.

2018 elections

Presidential elections were held in Mali on 29 July 2018. In July 2018, the Constitutional Court approved the nomination of a total of 24 candidates in the election. As no candidate received more than 50% of the vote in the first round, a runoff was held on 12 August 2018 between the top two candidates, incumbent president Ibrahim Boubacar Keïta of the Rally for Mali and Soumaïla Cissé of the Union for the Republic and Democracy. Keïta was subsequently re-elected with 67% of the vote.

2018 ceasefire and aftermath
In September 2018, the Centre for Humanitarian Dialogue negotiated a unilateral ceasefire with Dan Na Ambassagou "in the context of the conflict which opposes the group to other community armed groups in central Mali". However, the group has been blamed for the 24 March 2019 massacre of 160 Fula villagers. The group denied the attack, but afterwards Malian president Keita ordered the group to disband.

The UN Special Adviser on the Prevention of Genocide, Adama Dieng, warned of a growing ethnicization of the conflict.

The United Nations reported that the number of children killed in the conflict in the first six months of 2019 was twice as many for the entire year of 2018. Many of the children have been killed in intercommunal attacks attributed to ethnic militias, with the majority of attacks occurring around Mopti. It is reported that around 900 schools have closed down and that armed militias are recruiting children.

During the first week of October 2019, two jihadist attacks in the towns of Boulikessi and Mondoro killed more than 25 Mali soldiers near the border with Burkina Faso. President Keïta declared that "no military coup will prevail in Mali", continuing by saying that he doesn't think it "is on the agenda at all and cannot worry us".

2020 coup d'état and aftermath

Popular unrest began on 5 June 2020 following irregularities in the March and April parliamentary elections, including outrage against the kidnapping of opposition leader Soumaïla Cissé. Between 11 and 23 deaths followed protests that took place from 10 to 13 June. In July, President Keïta dissolved the constitutional court.

Members of the military led by Colonel Assimi Goïta and Colonel-Major Ismaël Wagué in Kati, Koulikoro Region, began a mutiny on 18 August 2020. President Ibrahim Boubacar Keïta and Prime Minister Boubou Cissé were arrested, and shortly after midnight Keïta announced his resignation, saying he did not want to see any bloodshed. Wagué announced the formation of the National Committee for the Salvation of the People (CNSP) and promised elections in the future. A curfew was begun and the streets of Bamako were quiet.

The Economic Community of West African States (ECOWAS) condemned the coup and demanded the reinstallation of President Keïta.

On 12 September 2020, the National Committee for the Salvation of the People (CNSP) agreed to an 18-month political transition to civilian rule. Shortly after, Bah N'daw was named interim president by a group of 17 electors, with Goïta being appointed vice president. The government was inaugurated on 25 September 2020.

On 18 January 2021, the transitional government announced that the CNSP had been disbanded, almost four months after had been promised under the initial agreement.

2021 coup d'état

Tensions have been high between the civilian transitional government and the military since the handover of power in September 2020.

On 24 May, tensions came to a head after a cabinet reshuffle, where two leaders of the 2020 military coup – Sadio Camara and Modibo Kone – were replaced by N'daw's administration. Later that day, journalists reported that three key civilian leaders – President N'daw, Prime Minister Moctar Ouane and Defence Minister Souleymane Doucouré, were being detained in a military base in Kati, outside Bamako. On 7 June 2021, Mali's military commander Assimi Goita was sworn into office as the new interim president.

2022 
On 10 January, Mali announced the closure of its borders and recalled several ambassadors to ECOWAS countries, in response to sanctions placed on Mali for deferring elections for four years. On 4 February, France's ambassador was expelled. According to Human Rights Watch (HRW) Malian troops and suspected Russian mercenaries from the Wagner group executed around 300 civilian men in central Mali in March 2022. France had withdrawn French troops from Mali in February 2022. On 2 May, the military government announced breaking its defence accords concluded in 2013 with France, constituting an additional step in the deterioration of Malian-French relations. This latest announcement has been criticized by French authorities and considered as "illegitimate". A UN panel reported that in the first three months of 2022, 543 civilians were killed and 269 wounded, warning the 2015 peace agreement between the government and pro-independence groups was threatened by a potential risk of confrontation for the first time in five years. The report also noted a sharp increase in the number of people needing humanitarian assistance over the previous year.

2023 
Sergey Lavrov, the Russian foreign minister, visited Bamako, Mali, on Tuesday February 7 and said that Moscow would continue to help Bamako improve its military capabilities. On February 23, Mali became one of seven countries to vote against the UN General Assembly motion calling for Russia to withdraw from Ukraine.

Geography

Mali is a landlocked country in West Africa, located southwest of Algeria. It lies between latitudes 10° and 25°N, and longitudes 13°W and 5°E. Mali borders Algeria to the north-northeast, Niger to the east, Burkina Faso to the south-east, Ivory Coast to the south, Guinea to the south-west, and Senegal to the west and Mauritania to the north-west.

At , Mali is the world's 24th-largest country and is comparable in size to South Africa or Angola. Most of the country lies in the southern Sahara Desert, which produces an extremely hot, dust-laden Sudanian savanna zone. Mali is mostly flat, rising to rolling northern plains covered by sand. The Adrar des Ifoghas massif lies in the northeast.

Mali lies in the torrid zone and is among the hottest countries in the world. The thermal equator, which matches the hottest spots year-round on the planet based on the mean daily annual temperature, crosses the country. Most of Mali receives negligible rainfall and droughts are very frequent. Late April to early October is the rainy season in the southernmost area. During this time, flooding of the Niger River is common, creating the Inner Niger Delta. The vast northern desert part of Mali has a hot desert climate (Köppen climate classification BWh) with long, extremely hot summers and scarce rainfall which decreases northwards. The central area has a hot semi-arid climate (Köppen climate classification BSh) with very high temperatures year-round, a long, intense dry season and a brief, irregular rainy season. The southern areas have a tropical wet and dry climate. (Köppen climate classification Aw) In review, Mali's climate is tropical, with March to May being the hot, dry season. June to October is rainy, humid and mild. November to February is the cool, dry season.

Mali has considerable natural resources, with gold, uranium, phosphates, kaolinite, salt and limestone being most widely exploited. Mali is estimated to have in excess of 17,400 tonnes of uranium (measured + indicated + inferred). In 2012, a further uranium mineralized north zone was identified. Mali faces numerous environmental challenges, including desertification, deforestation, soil erosion, and inadequate supplies of potable water.

Five terrestrial ecoregions lie within Mali's borders: Sahelian Acacia savanna, West Sudanian savanna, Inner Niger Delta flooded savanna, South Saharan steppe and woodlands, and West Saharan montane xeric woodlands. The country had a 2019 Forest Landscape Integrity Index mean score of 7.16/10, ranking it 51st globally out of 172 countries.

Regions and cercles

Since 2016, Mali has been divided into ten regions and the District of Bamako. Each region has a governor. The implementation of the two newest regions, Taoudénit (formerly part of Tombouctou Region) and Ménaka (formerly Ménaka Cercle in Gao Region), has been ongoing since January 2016; a governor and transitional council has been appointed for both regions. The ten regions in turn are subdivided into 56 cercles and 703 communes.

The régions and Capital District are:

Extent of central government control 
In March 2012, the Malian government lost control over Tombouctou, Gao and Kidal Regions and the north-eastern portion of Mopti Region. On 6 April 2012, the National Movement for the Liberation of Azawad unilaterally declared their secession from Mali as Azawad, an act that neither Mali nor the international community recognised. The government later regained control over these areas.

Politics and government

Government

Until the military coup of 22 March 2012, Mali was a constitutional democracy governed by the Constitution of 12 January 1992, which was amended in 1999. The constitution provides for a separation of powers among the executive, legislative, and judicial branches of government. The system of government can be described as "semi-presidential". Executive power is vested in a president, who is elected to a five-year term by universal suffrage and is limited to two terms.

The president serves as a chief of state and commander in chief of the armed forces. A prime minister appointed by the president serves as head of government and in turn appoints the Council of Ministers. The unicameral National Assembly is Mali's sole legislative body, consisting of deputies elected to five-year terms. Following the 2007 elections, the Alliance for Democracy and Progress held 113 of 160 seats in the assembly. The assembly holds two regular sessions each year, during which it debates and votes on legislation that has been submitted by a member or by the government.

Mali's constitution provides for an independent judiciary, but the executive continues to exercise influence over the judiciary by virtue of power to appoint judges and oversee both judicial functions and law enforcement. Mali's highest courts are the Supreme Court, which has both judicial and administrative powers, and a separate Constitutional Court that provides judicial review of legislative acts and serves as an election arbiter. Various lower courts exist, though village chiefs and elders resolve most local disputes in rural areas.

Despite continued pressure from ECOWAS, the initial timetable for a new election in February 2022 was pushed back and is now slated for February 2024.

Foreign relations 

Until 2012, Mali's foreign policy orientation had become increasingly pragmatic and pro-Western over time. Since the institution of a democratic form of government in 2002, Mali's relations with the West in general and with the United States in particular have improved significantly. Mali has a longstanding yet ambivalent relationship with France, a former colonial ruler. Mali was active in regional organizations such as the African Union until its suspension over the 2012 Malian coup d'état.

Working to control and resolve regional conflicts, such as in Ivory Coast, Liberia, and Sierra Leone, is one of Mali's major foreign policy goals. Mali feels threatened by the potential for the spillover of conflicts in neighboring states, and relations with those neighbors are often uneasy. General insecurity along borders in the north, including cross-border banditry and terrorism, remain troubling issues in regional relations.

In early 2019, Al Qaeda claimed responsibility for an attack on a United Nations base in Mali that killed 10 peacekeepers from Chad. 25 people were reported to have been injured in the attack. Al Qaeda's stated reason for the attack was Chad's re-establishing diplomatic ties with Israel. The base was attacked in Anguelhok, a village located in an especially unstable region of the country.

Military 

Mali's military forces consist of an army, which includes land forces and air force, as well as the paramilitary Gendarmerie and Republican Guard, all of which are under the control of Mali's Ministry of Defense and Veterans, headed by a civilian.

Economy

The Central Bank of West African States handles the financial affairs of Mali and additional members of the Economic Community of West African States. Mali is considered one of the poorest countries in the world. The average worker's annual salary is approximately US$1,500.

Mali underwent economic reform, beginning in 1988 by signing agreements with the World Bank and the International Monetary Fund. During 1988 to 1996, Mali's government largely reformed public enterprises. Since the agreement, sixteen enterprises were privatized, 12 partially privatized, and 20 liquidated. In 2005, the Malian government conceded a railroad company to the Savage Corporation. Two major companies, Societé de Telecommunications du Mali (SOTELMA) and the Cotton Ginning Company (CMDT), were expected to be privatized in 2008.

Between 1992 and 1995, Mali implemented an economic adjustment programme that resulted in economic growth and a reduction in financial imbalances. The programme increased social and economic conditions, and led to Mali joining the World Trade Organization on 31 May 1995.

Mali is also a member of the Organization for the Harmonization of Business Law in Africa (OHADA). The gross domestic product (GDP) has risen since. In 2002, the GDP amounted to US$3.4 billion, and increased to US$5.8 billion in 2005, which amounts to an approximately 17.6% annual growth rate.

Mali is a part of the "Franc Zone" (Zone Franc), which means that it uses the CFA franc. Mali is connected with the French government by agreement since 1962 (creation of BCEAO). Today all seven countries of BCEAO (including Mali) are connected to French Central Bank.

Agriculture 
Mali's key industry is agriculture. Cotton is the country's largest crop export and is exported west throughout Senegal and Ivory Coast. During 2002, 620,000 tons of cotton were produced in Mali but cotton prices declined significantly in 2003. In addition to cotton, Mali produces rice, millet, corn, vegetables, tobacco, and tree crops. Gold, livestock and agriculture amount to 80% of Mali's exports.

Eighty percent of Malian workers are employed in agriculture. 15% of Malian workers are employed in the service sector. Seasonal variations lead to regular temporary unemployment of agricultural workers.

Mining 
In 1991, with the assistance of the International Development Association, Mali relaxed the enforcement of mining codes which led to renewed foreign interest and investment in the mining industry. Gold is mined in the southern region and Mali has the third highest gold production in Africa (after South Africa and Ghana).

The emergence of gold as Mali's leading export product since 1999 has helped mitigate some of the negative impact of the cotton and Ivory Coast crises. Other natural resources include kaolin, salt, phosphate, and limestone.

Energy 

Electricity and water are maintained by the Energie du Mali, or EDM, and textiles are generated by Industry Textile du Mali, or ITEMA. Mali has made efficient use of hydroelectricity, consisting of over half of Mali's electrical power. In 2002, 700 GWh of hydroelectric power were produced in Mali.

Energie du Mali is an electric company that provides electricity to Mali citizens. Only 55% of the population in cities have access to EDM.

Transport infrastructure 

In Mali, there is a railway that connects to bordering countries. There are also approximately 29 airports of which 8 have paved runways. Urban areas are known for their large quantity of green and white taxicabs. A significant sum of the population is dependent on public transportation.

Demographics

In , Mali's population was an estimated  million. The population is predominantly rural (68% in 2002), and 5%–10% of Malians are nomadic. More than 90% of the population lives in the southern part of the country, especially in Bamako, which has over 2 million residents.

In 2007, about 48% of Malians were younger than 12 years old, 49% were 15–64 years old, and 3% were 65 and older. The median age was 15.9 years. The birth rate in 2014 is 45.53 births per 1,000, and the total fertility rate (in 2012) was 6.4 children per woman. The death rate in 2007 was 16.5 deaths per 1,000. Life expectancy at birth was 53.06 years total (51.43 for males and 54.73 for females). Mali has one of the world's highest rates of infant mortality, with 106 deaths per 1,000 live births in 2007.

Largest cities in Mali

Ethnic groups

Mali's population encompasses a number of sub-Saharan ethnic groups.
The Bambara are by far the largest single ethnic group, making up 36.5% of the population.

Collectively, the Bambara, Soninké, Khassonké, and Malinké (also called Mandinka), all part of the broader Mandé group, constitute 50% of Mali's population. Other significant groups are the Fula (17%), Voltaic (12%), Songhai (6%), and Tuareg and Moor (10%). In Mali as well as Niger, the Moors are also known as Azawagh Arabs, named after the Azawagh region of the Sahara. They speak mainly Hassaniya Arabic which is one of the regional varieties of Arabic.

In the far north, there is a division between Berber-descended Tuareg nomad populations and the darker-skinned Bella or Tamasheq people, due to the historical spread of slavery in the region.

An estimated 800,000 people in Mali are descended from slaves. Slavery in Mali has persisted for centuries.

The Arabic population kept slaves well into the 20th century, until slavery was suppressed by French authorities around the mid-20th century. There still persist certain hereditary servitude relationships, and according to some estimates, even today approximately 200,000 Malians are still enslaved.

Mixed European/African descendants of Muslims of Spanish, as well some French, Irish, Italian and Portuguese origins live in Mali, they are known as the Arma people (1% of the nation's population).

Although Mali has enjoyed a reasonably good inter-ethnic relationships based on the long history of coexistence, some hereditary servitude and bondage relationship exist, as well as ethnic tension between settled Songhai and nomadic Tuaregs of the north. Due to a backlash against the northern population after independence, Mali is now in a situation where both groups complain about discrimination on the part of the other group. This conflict also plays a role in the continuing Northern Mali conflict where there is a tension between both Tuaregs and the Malian government, and the Tuaregs and radical Islamists who are trying to establish sharia law.

Languages 

While the country's official language is French, the lingua franca in Mali is Bambara, which about 80 percent of the population can communicate in. Due to deteriorating relations between the Malian military junta and the French government, the Mali government announced making Bambara the official language in January 2022, although this proposal has not yet been official. Over 40 other African languages are spoken by the various ethnic groups of Mali.

According to the 2009 census, the languages spoken in Mali were Bambara by 51.5%, Fula by 8.3%, Dogon by 6.6% Soninké by 5.7%, Songhai by 5.3%, Mandinka by 5.2%, Minianka by 3.8%, Tamasheq by 3.2%, Sénoufo by 2%, Bobo by 1.9%, Tieyaxo Bozo by 1.6%, Kassonké by 1.1%, Maure by 1%, Dafing by 0.4%, Samogo by 0.4%, Arabic (Hassaniya) by 0.3%, other Malian languages by 0.5%, other African languages by 0.2%, Foreign languages by 0.2%, and 0.7% didn't declare their language.

Religion

Islam was introduced to West Africa in the 11th century and remains the predominant religion in much of the region. An estimated 90% of Malians are Muslim (mostly Sunni), approximately 5% are Christian (about two-thirds Roman Catholic and one-third Protestant) and the remaining 5% adhere to traditional African religions such as the Dogon religion. Atheism and agnosticism are believed to be rare among Malians, most of whom practice their religion daily.

The constitution establishes a secular state and provides for freedom of religion, and the government largely respects this right.

Islam as historically practiced in Mali has been malleable and adapted to local conditions; relations between Muslims and practitioners of minority religious faiths have generally been amicable.
After the 2012 imposition of sharia rule in northern parts of the country, however, Mali came to be listed high (number 7) in the Christian persecution index published by Open Doors, which described the persecution in the north as severe.

Education 

Public education in Mali is in principle provided free of charge and is compulsory for nine years between the ages of seven and sixteen. The system encompasses six years of primary education beginning at age 7, followed by six years of secondary education. Mali's actual primary school enrollment rate is low, in large part because families are unable to cover the cost of uniforms, books, supplies, and other fees required to attend.

In 2017, the primary school enrollment rate was 61% (65% of males and 58% of females). In the late 1990s, the secondary school enrollment rate was 15% (20% of males and 10% of females). The education system is plagued by a lack of schools in rural areas, as well as shortages of teachers and materials.

Estimates of literacy rates in Mali range from 27–30 to 46.4%, with literacy rates significantly lower among women than men. The University of Bamako, which includes four constituent universities, is the largest university in the country and enrolls approximately 60,000 undergraduate and graduate students.

Health 

Mali faces numerous health challenges related to poverty, malnutrition, and inadequate hygiene and sanitation. Mali's health and development indicators rank among the worst in the world. Life expectancy at birth is estimated to be 53.06 years in 2012. In 2000, 62–65% of the population was estimated to have access to safe drinking water and only 69% to sanitation services of some kind. In 2001, the general government expenditures on health totaled about US$4 per capita at an average exchange rate.

Efforts have been made to improve nutrition, and reduce associated health problems, by encouraging women to make nutritious versions of local recipes. For example, the International Crops Research Institute for the Semi-Arid Tropics (ICRISAT) and the Aga Khan Foundation, trained women's groups to make equinut, a healthy and nutritional version of the traditional recipe di-dèguè (comprising peanut paste, honey and millet or rice flour). The aim was to boost nutrition and livelihoods by producing a product that women could make and sell, and which would be accepted by the local community because of its local heritage.

Medical facilities in Mali are very limited, and medicines are in short supply. Malaria and other arthropod-borne diseases are prevalent in Mali, as are a number of infectious diseases such as cholera and tuberculosis. Mali's population also suffers from a high rate of child malnutrition and a low rate of immunization. An estimated 1.9% of the adult and children population was afflicted with HIV/AIDS that year, among the lowest rates in Sub-Saharan Africa. An estimated 85%–91% of Mali's girls and women have had female genital mutilation (2006 and 2001 data).

Gender equality 
In 2017, Mali ranked 157th out of 160 countries in the gender inequality index as reported by the United Nations Development Programme. The Malian Constitution states that it protects women's rights, however many laws exist that discriminate against women. Provisions in the laws limit women's decision-making power after marriage, in which the husband becomes superior to his wife. Women are blamed for not maintaining the appearance of their husbands and are also blamed for the actions of their children if they misbehave, which encourages the cultural attitude that women are inferior to men. The lack of participation of women in politics is due to the idea that politics is associated with men and that women should avoid this sector. Education is also an area in which boys dominate, since it is a better investment for the parents. As traditional values and practices have contributed to gender inequality in Mali, conflict and lawlessness have also influenced the growing gap in gender through gender-based violence. The unstable government of Mali has led to organizations like USAID attempting to improve the lives of the people, mainly women and girls' rights in order to re-engage the development of the country.

Gender relations 
Religion, the patriarchal norms, and gender-based violence are major negative factors shaping the life of women in Mali. Patriarchal norms cause major gender inequalities and lead to male domination within the household. Girls learn household activities like chores, cooking, childcare, etc. at a young age and are expected to take the main responsibility of household chores throughout their life. This hampers women's ability to enter the formal workforce and leads to a lack of education of girls. Gender-based violence in Mali happens both on a national and a family level. At the national level, in 2012 the conflict in the Northern part of the country increased cases of kidnappings and rapes. The conflict also reduced women's access to resources, economy, and opportunities. At the household level, Malian women face gender-based violence through domestic violence, forced marriages, and marital rape. The Demographic Health Survey for Mali in 2013 stated that 76% of women and 54% of men believed physical harm towards women was acceptable if the women burnt food, argued back, went out without notifying her husband, or refused sexual relations with her husband.

Area of opportunity 
The lack of education has increased gender inequality in Mali because not many women are working outside the household are even participating in the Public Administration sector. After adjusting the entrance requirements and access to education, girls still have lower enrollment rates and less access to formal education. Drop-out rates for girls are 15% higher than that of boys because they have a higher responsibility at home and most parents refuse to allow all their children to go to school, so boys tend to become educated. Similarly, technical and vocational education has a lower numbers of girls participating and are inadequately distributed in the country because the training centers are focused in the urban cities. Finally, higher education for girls consist of short programs because early marriages prevent most girls from pursuing a longer term education program like those in science. Although women do not have the same access of education, in recent decades women have been entering and representing in decision-making positions in the Public Administration sector. Out of 147 members of Parliament, 15 were women in 2010. Recent decades show that women are slowly joining important decision-making positions which is changing the attitude and status of women in Mali, which has led to the promotion of women's right in the political sphere.

Efforts 
Legislation at the international and national levels have been implemented over the decades to help promote women's rights in Mali. At the international, Mali signed the Beijing Platform for Action which suggest that women should participate in decision-making and the convention on the Elimination of All Forms of Discrimination against Women which is the foundation to women's rights promotion. At the national level, Mali's Constitution has the Decree No. 092-073P-CTSP that claims equality to all Malian citizens and discrimination is prohibited, which has not been followed. The Poverty Reduction Strategy Programme (PRSP) and the Growth and Poverty Reduction Strategy Programme under the Malian Government seek to improve the well-being of the citizens, and changes to governance and gender in the country. The Ministry for Advancement of Women, Children and the Family was created specifically for women and children so that their basics rights and needs get met under the law. Although there exists legislation and policy for gender equality the institutionalization of the National Gender Policy of Mali is necessary to support the importance of women's rights. Strengthening and the support of girls' and women's access to education and training is recommended to improve gender equality in Mali. The involvement of international organizations like USAID assist Mali financially to enhance their development through the efforts of the improvement of women's rights.

Culture

The varied everyday culture of Malians reflects the country's ethnic and geographic diversity. Most Malians wear flowing, colorful robes called boubous that are typical of West Africa. Malians frequently participate in traditional festivals, dances, and ceremonies.

Music 

Malian musical traditions are derived from the griots, who are known as "Keepers of Memories". Malian music is diverse and has several different genres. Some famous Malian influences in music are kora virtuoso musician Toumani Diabaté, the ngoni with Bassekou Kouyate the virtuoso of the electric jeli ngoni, the late roots and blues guitarist Ali Farka Touré, the Tuareg band Tinariwen, Khaira Arby, and several Afro-pop artists such as Salif Keita, the duo Amadou et Mariam, Oumou Sangare, Fatoumata Diawara, Rokia Traore, and Habib Koité. Dance also plays a large role in Malian culture. Dance parties are common events among friends, and traditional mask dances are performed at ceremonial events.

Literature 
Though Mali's literature is less famous than its music, Mali has always been one of Africa's liveliest intellectual centers. Mali's literary tradition is passed mainly by word of mouth, with jalis reciting or singing histories and stories known by heart. Amadou Hampâté Bâ, Mali's best-known historian, spent much of his life writing these oral traditions down for the world to remember.

The best-known novel by a Malian writer is Yambo Ouologuem's Le devoir de violence, which won the 1968 Prix Renaudot but whose legacy was marred by accusations of plagiarism. Other well-known Malian writers include Baba Traoré, Modibo Sounkalo Keita, Massa Makan Diabaté, Moussa Konaté, and Fily Dabo Sissoko.

Sport 

The most popular sport in Mali is association football, which became more prominent after Mali hosted the 2002 African Cup of Nations. Most towns and cities have regular games; the most popular teams nationally are Djoliba AC, Stade Malien, and Real Bamako, all based in the capital. Informal games are often played by youths using a bundle of rags as a ball.

Basketball is another major sport; the Mali women's national basketball team, led by Hamchetou Maiga, competed at the 2008 Beijing Olympics. Traditional wrestling (la lutte) is also somewhat common, though popularity has declined in recent years. The game wari, a mancala variant, is a common pastime.

Mali featured a men's national team in beach volleyball that competed at the 2018–2020 CAVB Beach Volleyball Continental Cup.

Cuisine

Rice and millet are the staples of Malian cuisine, which is heavily based on cereal grains. Grains are generally prepared with sauces made from edible leaves, such as spinach or baobab, with tomato peanut sauce, and may be accompanied by pieces of grilled meat (typically chicken, mutton, beef, or goat). Malian cuisine varies regionally. Other popular dishes include fufu, jollof rice, and maafe.

Media

Telecommunications in Mali include 869,600 mobile phones, 45,000 televisions and 414,985 Internet users.

Notable people
 

Mamadou Namory Traoré, Mali government minister

See also

 Index of Mali-related articles
 Outline of Mali

Notes

References

Bibliography

  A student-translated English version  is also available.
 
  This article incorporates text from this source, which is in the public domain.

External links

 Official website 
 
 
 Mali. The World Factbook. Central Intelligence Agency.
 Mali from UCB Libraries GovPubs
 
 Mali profile from the BBC News
 Possibilities and Challenges for Transitional Justice in Mali from the ICTJ
 Facebook group about Ngoni, considered a traditional instrument of Mali; also known as Xalam, Jeli N'goni, Hoddu, Khalam, Tehardent, or Gambare.

Trade
 Mali 2012 Trade Summary Statistics

 
1960 establishments in Africa
Countries in Africa
Former French colonies
French-speaking countries and territories
Landlocked countries
Least developed countries
Member states of the Organisation internationale de la Francophonie
Member states of the African Union
Member states of the Organisation of Islamic Cooperation
Member states of the United Nations
Republics
Saharan countries
States and territories established in 1960
West African countries
Arabic-speaking countries and territories